The Hammond River is a tributary of the Kennebecasis River in New Brunswick, Canada. It rises in the Caledonia Highlands near the rural community of Hammondvale and runs in a westerly direction to its junction with the Kennebecasis River. Near the mouth of the river, at the rural community of Nauwigewauk, the river is joined by a short tributary draining Darlings Lake.

The Hammond River is one of the few rivers in the world that still has spawning Atlantic salmon. It was named for Andrew Hamond, Lieutenant Governor of Nova Scotia from 1781 to 1782, who owned land in the area.

References

See also
List of bodies of water of New Brunswick

Rivers of New Brunswick